Horshim (lit. Ploughmen) is a kibbutz in central Israel. Located in the south of the Sharon plain and covering 3,000 dunams, it falls under the jurisdiction of Drom HaSharon Regional Council.

Etymology
The village's name is taken from the biblical valley of Charashim (I Chron. 4:14)."

References

Kibbutzim
Kibbutz Movement
Populated places established in 1955
Populated places in Central District (Israel)
1955 establishments in Israel